The El Gouna International 2012 is the men's edition of the 2012 El Gouna International, which is a PSA World Series event Gold (Prize money: $115,000). The event took place at the Abu Tig Marina in El Gouna in Egypt from 8 April to 13 April. Ramy Ashour won his first El Gouna International trophy, beating James Willstrop in the final.

Prize money and ranking points
For 2012, the prize purse was $115,000. The prize money and points breakdown is as follows:

Seeds

Draw and results

See also
El Gouna International
2012 Men's British Open

References

External links
PSA El Gouna International 2012 website
El Gouna International 2012 official website

Squash tournaments in Egypt
Men's El Gouna International
Men's El Gouna International